Aditi Lahiri  (born 1952
Calcutta, India) is an Indian-born British linguist and has held the Chair of Linguistics at the University of Oxford since 2007. She is a Fellow of Somerville College, Oxford. Her main research interests are in phonology, phonetics, historical linguistics, psycholinguistics, and neurolinguistics.

Early life and education
Lahiri was born on 14 July 1952 in Calcutta, India. She was educated at the Bethune College, Kolkata, India, and later at the University of Calcutta. She earned two doctorates; one from the University of Calcutta in comparative philology and one in linguistics from Brown University.

Academic career
Lahiri has taught at the University of California at Los Angeles and at the University of California at Santa Cruz, and worked as a research scientist at the Max Planck Institute for Psycholinguistics in the Netherlands and as a professor at the University of Konstanz.

She has held the Chair of Linguistics at the University of Oxford and been a fellow of Somerville College, Oxford since 2007.

She is now Director of the Language and Brain Lab and Principal Investigator of the MORPHON project (Resolving Morpho-Phonological Alternation: Historical, Neurolinguistic, and Computational Approaches), funded by the European Research Council.

Honours
In 2007, Lahiri was elected a Member of the Academia Europaea. In 2010, she was elected a Fellow of the British Academy (FBA).

She received the Gottfried Wilhelm Leibniz Prize in 2000.

Lahiri was appointed Commander of the Order of the British Empire (CBE) in the 2020 New Year Honours for services to the study of linguistics.

References

1952 births
Gottfried Wilhelm Leibniz Prize winners
Living people
Linguists from Bengal
Bethune College alumni
University of Calcutta alumni
Brown University alumni
University of California, Los Angeles faculty
University of California, Santa Cruz faculty
Academic staff of the University of Konstanz
Commanders of the Order of the British Empire
Fellows of Somerville College, Oxford
Fellows of the British Academy
Members of Academia Europaea
Indian emigrants to the United Kingdom
People from Kolkata
20th-century Indian linguists
21st-century Indian linguists
Naturalised citizens of the United Kingdom
Linguists from the United Kingdom
Women linguists